Malden is a village in Bureau County, Illinois, United States. The population was 318 at the 2010 census. It is part of the Ottawa Micropolitan Statistical Area.

Geography
Malden is located at  (41.424834, -89.368444).

Demographics

As of the 2020 census there were 318 people, 152 households, and 104 families residing in the village. The racial makeup of the village was 94.34% White, 1.89% African American, 1.89% from other races, and 1.89% from two or more races. Hispanic or Latino of any race were 4.40% of the population.

There were 152 households, out of which 65.13% had children under the age of 18 living with them, 46.05% were married couples living together, 11.84% had a female householder with no husband present, and 31.58% were non-families. 21.71% of all households were made up of individuals, and 9.87% had someone living alone who was 65 years of age or older. The average household size was 2.99 and the average family size was 2.70.

The village's age distribution consisted of 28.7% under the age of 18, 4.4% from 18 to 24, 30.4% from 25 to 44, 24.3% from 45 to 64, and 12.2% who were 65 years of age or older. The median age was 33.0 years. For every 100 females, there were 91.2 males. For every 100 females age 18 and over, there were 115.4 males.

The median income for a household in the village was $49,688, and the median income for a family was $64,375. Males had a median income of $34,844 versus $18,750 for females. The per capita income for the village was $20,975. About 19.2% of families and 23.7% of the population were below the poverty line, including 39.4% of those under age 18 and 16.0% of those age 65 or over.

References

Villages in Bureau County, Illinois
Villages in Illinois
Ottawa, IL Micropolitan Statistical Area